Satyam Sivam is a 1981 Indian Telugu-language action film, produced by D. Venkateswara Rao under the Eeswari Creations banner and directed by K. Raghavendra Rao. The film stars N. T. Rama Rao, Akkineni Nageswara Rao, Sridevi and Rati Agnihotri, with music composed by Chakravarthy. The film is a remake of the Hindi film Suhaag (1979).

Plot 
Nagaraju (Satyanarayana) and Janaki (Pushpalata) have been a married couple, but he never felt that she is his wife; he abandons her. Janki gives birth to twins and Seshu (Prabhakar Reddy), a gangster, steals one of them and sells him to a bootlegger, Kunti (Tyagaraju). Nagaraju has taken to crime in a big way and as a result has antagonized a rival gangster, Seshu. Janaki is upset when she finds her son missing, with a lot of difficulties, she brings up her son, Satyam (Akkineni Nageswara Rao) and he is now a dedicated police officer. On the other hand, Kunti has exploited Sivam (N. T. Rama Rao), kept him illiterate, and made him a petty criminal & alcoholic. This gets him into a confrontation with Satyam, but ironically the two settle their differences and become fast friends. Nagaraju is not aware of his two sons and wife being alive. Without revealing his identity, Satyam is appointed to catch Nagaraju's gang and Sivam always supports him and they, together with other police personnel, keep vigil. Things do not go as planned; they are attacked as a result Satyam loses his eyesight, leaving the onus on Sivam to try to locate the person behind this crime.

Cast 

N. T. Rama Rao as Sivam
Nageswara Rao as Satyam
Sridevi as Parvathi
Rati Agnihotri as Rekha
Satyanarayana as Nagaraju
Mohan Babu
Prabhakar Reddy as Seshu
Allu Ramalingaiah as Constable Pachipulusu Paramanandam
Mikkilineni as Dada
Bhanu Chander as Gopal
Tyagaraju as Kunti
P. J. Sarma as I.G.
Chalapathi Rao as Inspector Chalapathi Rao
Raavi Kondala Rao
Vijayashanti as Santhi
Pushpalatha as Janaki
Pushpa Kumari
Athili Lakshmi
Krishna Veni as Lalitha

Soundtrack 

Music composed by Chakravarthy. Lyrics were written by Veturi.

References

External links 
 

1980s Telugu-language films
1981 films
Films directed by K. Raghavendra Rao
Films scored by K. Chakravarthy
Telugu remakes of Hindi films